Joachim Louis-Paul Havard de la Montagne (30 November 1927 – 1 October 2003) was a French composer, organist and choral director.

Life 
Havard de la Montagne was the son of French parents; Charles (born 1891) and Marie-Thérèse Eugénie (born 1899, née de Payret), who settled in his birthplace of Geneva, where his father worked for an international organisation. After the war he moved to Paris and studied music at the École César Franck. Havard de la Montagne held the position of Kapellmeister at the église de la Madeleine in Paris, assisted by his wife Elisabeth, also and organist and harpsichordist. In 1971-1974, he founded the Choirs and the "Ensemble Instrumental de la Madeleine", with which he gave more than 300 concerts.

He is the author of an extensive repertoire of classical music, very inspired by Gabriel Fauré, Maurice Duruflé, Louis Vierne and Gregorian chant.

Joachim Havard de la Montagne died in Geneva on 1 October 2003 aged 75, following a long illness.

External links 
 Biographie détaillée
 Mes longs chemins de musicien on musimem.com
 Joachim Havard de la Montagne on Discogs

20th-century French composers
French male composers
French classical organists
French male organists
French choral conductors
French male conductors (music)
1927 births
Musicians from Geneva
2003 deaths
Deaths from cancer in Switzerland
20th-century organists
20th-century French conductors (music)
20th-century French male musicians
Male classical organists